Ananthura is a genus of flowering plants belonging to the family Asteraceae.

Its native range is Kenya to Southern Tropical Africa.

Species:

Ananthura pteropoda

References

Asteraceae
Asteraceae genera